Glycosmis trifoliata, the pink fruited limeberry, is a species of shrub or small tree in the family Rutaceae. Found in northern Australia, Papua New Guinea and Malesia. The habitat includes monsoon forest, beach scrub, vine thickets and drier rainforest areas.

References

trifoliata
Flora of Queensland
Flora of Malesia
Flora of Western Australia
Flora of the Northern Territory
Flora of Papua New Guinea